West Fork School District 141 is a public school district based in West Fork, Washington County, Arkansas, United States.

Schools 
 West Fork Elementary School, serving prekindergarten through grade 4.
 West Fork Middle School, serving grades 5 through 8.
 West Fork High School, serving grades 9 through 12.

References

External links 
 

Education in Washington County, Arkansas
School districts in Arkansas